Bullet: Ek Dhamaka is a 2005 Hindi-language espionage action film directed by Irfan Khan and produced by Asad Sikandar. This movie was released on 4 February 2005 under the banner of Diana S. Films. Iqbal Khan played the lead role in the movie.

Plot 
Indian intelligence received an alarming report regarding the upcoming terrorist attack on 26 January, Republic Day (India). They assigned a lady agents Bobby and Mr. Arjun Singh to infiltrate the terrorists, known to be operating from Bulgaria. Bobby and Arjun accepted this assignment, but Arjun leaves the mission when he finds out that Don Raja, a Bulgaria-based international gangster, who was previously a Police Inspector of Nashik is the mastermind behind these terrorist attacks. After resigning, he decides to chase Don Raja on his own as he has a personal grudge to settle with him. A patriotic civilian named Asad befriended with Arjun. Asad lost his family by a terrorist group led by Don Raja and trying to take revenge. Boby contacted Asad for help. On the other side, Arjun also tried to convinced Raja's girlfriend Sarah, an ex film heroin, for information, but latter himself arrested by the Bulgarian police as a suspected terrorist. One Indian-Bulgarian lady police officer Sofie helped him to escape from the prison and assist Arjun in the mission. Arjun realized that someone Indian secret agent is working for Don Raja.

Cast 
 Iqbal Khan as Arjun Singh
 Saadhika Randhawa as Sarah
 Asad Sikandar as Asad Kashmiri
 Aseem Merchant as Don Raja
 Saayli Buva as Boby
 Natalya Gudkova as Asad's Wife
 Rosy Venrose as Sofie

References

External links
 

2005 films
Indian spy thriller films
2000s Hindi-language films
Indian spy action films
Fictional Indian secret agents
2005 action thriller films
2000s spy thriller films
20th Century Fox films